The Men's 100 metres at the 2014 Commonwealth Games, as part of the athletics programme, took place at Hampden Park on 27 and 28 July 2014.
Kemar Bailey-Cole won the gold medal.

Records

First round

The first round consisted of nine heats, with qualification for the first two in each heat and the sixth fastest losers. However, due to a dead heat for second in Heat 7, three runners qualified automatically, and the fastest losers places were reduced to five. Adam Gemili was the fastest qualifier from the first round, at 10.15 seconds.

Heat 1

Heat 2

Heat 3

Heat 4

Heat 5

Heat 6

Heat 7

Heat 8

Heat 9

Semifinals

Three semi-finals were held, with automatic qualification restricted to the first two finishers in each heat, and the next two fastest athletes across the three semi-finals. Kemar Bailey-Cole was the fastest qualifier in 10.00 seconds.

Heat 1

Heat 2

Heat 3

Final

References
General
Men's 100m Round 1 – Qualification Standings
Specific

Men's 100 metres
2014